Uilgan River is a river in the Tsagaan-Üür Sum of Khövsgöl Aimag in Mongolia.

It starts in the confluence of several smaller rivers near the Russian border,
and discharges into the Üür River a bit downriver from the Tsagaan-Üür sum center and the mouth of the Arigiin River.

References

See also
List of rivers of Mongolia

Rivers of Mongolia